Statistics of Belgian First Division in the 1932–33 season.

Overview

It was contested by 14 teams, and Royale Union Saint-Gilloise won the championship.

League standings

Results

References

Belgian Pro League seasons
Belgian First Division, 1932-33
1932–33 in Belgian football